Age bias may refer to:

Ageism, stereotyping or discrimination based on age
Age bias (medicine), treatment of a patient based predominantly on patient's age
Age bias (employment), age discrimination in workforce